Credit Valley Hospital is a regional hospital located in Mississauga, Ontario. Officially opened on November 5, 1985, it is now part of the Trillium Health Partners hospital group and primarily serves the communities of north Mississauga: Streetsville, Meadowvale, Erin Mills and the surrounding area. In 2012, it was ranked as the best hospital in the Greater Toronto Area in a study conducted by the Canadian Institute for Health Information.

Services
The hospital provides services and covers areas of medicine including:
Cardiac services
Continuing care/rehabilitation
Emergency
General medicine
Genetics
Mental health
Diagnostic Imaging
Obstetrics and gynecology
Oncology
Paediatrics
Renal dialysis
Surgery

The hospital is equipped with a ground level helipad north of the hospital at Eglinton Avenue West and Credit Valley Road.

Expansion
The hospital has expanded to include a new cancer treatment centre (The Carlo Fidani Peel Regional Cancer Centre) and also a regional maternal child care program. The cancer centre serves a catchment area of 1.6 million people. In addition to chemotherapy, there are six linear accelerators (radiation treatment machines).

Bus Terminal

The Credit Valley Hospital Bus Terminal is located in western Mississauga, Ontario, Canada. It is situated on the northern side of the hospital.

The bus terminal contains bus shelters.

MiWay routes
For the Mississauga site, bus service is exclusively by MiWay. However, GO Transit indirectly serves the terminal by stopping at the entrances of Eglinton Avenue and Erin Mills Parkway
All MiWay routes are wheelchair-accessible.

GO Transit
GO Transit buses stop at the entrances of the hospital.

References

External links

Hospital buildings completed in 1985
Buildings and structures in Mississauga
Heliports in Ontario
Hospitals established in 1985
Hospitals in the Regional Municipality of Peel
Hospitals affiliated with the University of Toronto
Certified airports in Ontario
1985 establishments in Ontario